Achmat Dangor (2 October 1948 – 6 September 2020) was a South African writer, poet, and development professional. His most important works include the novels Kafka's Curse (1997) and Bitter Fruit (2001). He was also the author of three collections of poetry, a novella, and a short story collection.

Dangor was born in Johannesburg, Union of South Africa. He was one of the founding members of the Congress of South African Writers, and headed up various non-governmental organisations in South Africa, including the Nelson Mandela Children's Fund, the Nelson Mandela Foundation and was the Southern Africa Representative for the Ford Foundation. In 2015 he was given a Lifetime Achievement Award by the South African Literary Awards (SALA). He lived in Johannesburg, South Africa, with his wife, Audrey, and young son Zachary, and devoted his time to his writing.

Awards

His awards included:
 1998 Herman Charles Bosman Prize for Kafka's Curse
 Bitter Fruit was shortlisted for the 2004 Booker Prize.

Notable works

 Waiting for Leila (1981)
 Voices from Within (1982) 
 Bulldozer (1983)
 Majiet (1986)
 The Z Town trilogy (1990)
 Private Voices (1992)
 Kafka’s Curse (1997)
 Bitter Fruit (2003)
 Strange Pilgrimages (2013)
 Dikeledi: Child of Tears, No More (2017)

Family

Dangor is the brother of Jessie Duarte.

References

External links
Interview with Achmat Dangor on The Ledge, an independent platform for world literature (includes excerpt and audio)



1948 births
2020 deaths
South African male poets
South African male novelists
South African people of Indian descent
South African people of Dutch descent
20th-century South African poets
20th-century South African novelists
21st-century South African poets
21st-century South African novelists
20th-century South African male writers
21st-century South African male writers